Highway 132 (AR 132, Ark. 132, Hwy. 132, and University Blvd) is an east–west state highway in Morrilton, Conway County, Arkansas. The highway runs  from Highway 95 east to Highway 9 Business (Hwy. 9B). The route serves as a main arterial street in Morrilton, connecting two major north–south streets to the University of Arkansas Community College at Morrilton (UACCM).

Route description
Highway 132 begins at Highway 95 in western Morrilton, near Interstate 40 (I-40). The route runs east to an intersection with Highway 247, known as Poor Farm Rd within Morrilton. After this intersection, Highway 132 passes along the southern edge of the University of Arkansas Community College at Morrilton (UACCM) campus before intersecting Highway 9B, where it terminates.

History
The original Highway 132 was designated in 1928 from Business US 82 in Magnolia to the Louisiana border. This route became part of US 371 in 1994. The current Highway 132 in Morrilton was added to the state highway system at the request of the city's mayor in 1997. The segment was added as part of an exchange that transferred a former portion of Highway 9B from US Highway 64 (US 64) to Highway 9 to city maintenance.

Major intersections

Former route

The route began at US 82 and ran south to the Louisiana state line. The route was created in 1928 and replaced by the US 371 designation in 1994.

Initially referenced as the Bi-State Corridor, the Arkansas State Highway Commission designated Highway 132 and several other highways as a proposed corridor to seek American Association of State Highway and Transportation Officials approval as a US Highway in January 1994. Upon receiving approval, the route was officially decommissioned in favor of US 371 on August 24, 1994.

See also

References

External links

132
Transportation in Conway County, Arkansas
132